Hu Jyun-saing is a Taiwanese weightlifter. He represented Taiwan at the 2019 World Weightlifting Championships.

References 

Living people
1999 births
Taiwanese male weightlifters
20th-century Taiwanese people
21st-century Taiwanese people